Sean Harlow (born March 28, 1995) is an American football center for the Arizona Cardinals of the National Football League (NFL). He played college football at Oregon State. Pat Harlow is his father.

Professional career

Atlanta Falcons
Harlow was drafted by the Atlanta Falcons in the fourth round, 136th overall, in the 2017 NFL Draft.

On September 1, 2018, Harlow was waived by the Falcons.

Indianapolis Colts
On September 10, 2018, Harlow was signed to the Indianapolis Colts' practice squad. He was released on October 18, 2018.

Atlanta Falcons (second stint)

2018 season
On October 23, 2018, Harlow was signed to the Atlanta Falcons practice squad. He signed a reserve/future contract with the Falcons on December 31, 2018.

2019 season
On August 31, 2019, Harlow was waived by the Falcons and was signed to the practice squad the next day. He was promoted to the active roster on November 9, 2019. He was waived on November 23, 2019 and re-signed to the practice squad. He was promoted back to the active roster on December 20, 2019.

2020 season
On September 5, 2020, Harlow was waived by the Falcons and signed to the practice squad the next day. He was elevated to the active roster on December 26 for the team's week 16 game against the Kansas City Chiefs, and reverted to the practice squad after the game.

Arizona Cardinals
On January 6, 2021, Harlow signed a reserve/future contract with the Arizona Cardinals. He was released on August 31, 2021 and re-signed to the practice squad the next day. He was promoted to the active roster on September 25, 2021.

References

External links
Atlanta Falcons bio
 Oregon State Beavers bio

1995 births
Living people
American football offensive linemen
Arizona Cardinals players
Atlanta Falcons players
Indianapolis Colts players
Oregon State Beavers football players
People from San Clemente, California
Players of American football from California
Sportspeople from Orange County, California